Puente de las Calabazas is a single-span lattice girder bridge over the Cuyón River near Coamo, Puerto Rico on the Carreterra Central that dates from 1882.  It was designed by Ricardo (or Raimundo?) Camprubi and was fabricated by Eugen Rollin and Co., a Belgian firm that exported via Spain from Braine le Comte, Belgium.  Prolific engineer Camprubí designed several single span lattice bridges in Puerto Rico.  He also designed the first two-span lattice girder bridge in Puerto Rico, the Padre Inigo Bridge (in Coamo, No. 174), which is also NRHP-listed.  All of these were part of the Carretera Central.

It was listed on the U.S. National Register of Historic Places in 2009.

References

External links
 
 Summary sheet from the Puerto Rico State Historic Preservation Office 
 , National Register of Historic Places cover documentation

Bridges completed in 1882
Road bridges on the National Register of Historic Places in Puerto Rico
Coamo, Puerto Rico
1882 establishments in Puerto Rico
Girder bridges